"Drowning Not Waving" is a song by Australian pop group Bachelor Girl. The song was released in October 2002 as the second  and final single from the group's second studio album, Dysfunctional (2002). The song peaked at number 69 on the ARIA Charts.

Track listing
 CD Single
 "Drowning Not Waving" - 4:36
 "Drowning Not Waving"  (Jack remix)  - 3:51
 "Guilt Trip" - 3:40

 CD Single (remixes)
 "Drowning Not Waving"  (The K Man remix) 	
 "Drowning Not Waving"  (Tidal Chaos mix

Charts

Release history

References

Bachelor Girl songs
2002 singles
2002 songs